Ancistrus montanus is a species of catfish in the family Loricariidae. It is native to South America, where it occurs in high-altitude freshwater environments, with the type specimen being collected from an elevation of around 457 m (1500 ft), in the Beni River basin in the upper Madeira River drainage in Bolivia. The species reaches 9.2 cm (3.6 inches) SL.

References 

montanus
Fish described in 1904
Fauna of Bolivia
Taxa named by Charles Tate Regan